Graphic animation  is a variation of stop motion (and possibly more conceptually associated with traditional flat cel animation and paper drawing animation, but still technically qualifying as stop motion) consisting of the animation of photographs (in whole or in parts) and other non-drawn flat visual graphic material, such as newspaper and magazine clippings.

Technique
In its simplest form, Graphic "animation" can take the form of the animation camera merely panning up and down and/or across individual photographs, one at a time, (filmed frame-by-frame, and hence, "animated") without changing the photographs from frame to frame. But once the photos (or "graphics") are also moved from frame to frame, more exciting montages of movement can be produced, such as on Los Angeles animator Mike Jittlov's 1977 short film, Animato. Graphic animation can be (and often is) combined with other forms of animation including direct manipulation animation, and traditional cel animation.

Notable films
Examples are Frank Mouris' 1973 Oscar-winning short film Frank Film, and Charles Braverman's Condensed Cream of the Beatles (1974), originally produced for Geraldo Rivera's late night TV show at the time, Goodbye America.

See also
Collage film
Cutout animation
Motion graphics

References

Animation techniques
Experimental film
Collage